Westbury is a civil parish in Shropshire, England.  It contains 55 listed buildings that are recorded in the National Heritage List for England.  Of these, five are listed at Grade II*, the middle of the three grades, and the others are at Grade II, the lowest grade.  The parish contains the villages of Westbury, Stoney Stretton and Yockleton, and smaller settlements, and is otherwise rural.  Most of the listed buildings are houses and associated structures, cottages, farmhouses and farm buildings, the earliest of which are timber framed or have timber-framed cores.  The other listed buildings include two churches, items in a churchyard, a country house and associated structures, and a watermill.


Key

Buildings

References

Citations

Sources

Lists of buildings and structures in Shropshire